Rudbal (also Romanized as Rūdbāl and Rūd Bāl; also known as Rūdbāl-e Manūchehr Khān, Rūdbāl-e Markazī, Rūdban, and Rūdbār) is a village in Hamaijan Rural District, Hamaijan District, Sepidan County, Fars Province, Iran. At the 2006 census, its population was 1,899, in 407 families.

References 

Populated places in Sepidan County